Stephen James Bertram Vair (October 11, 1886 – July 27, 1959) was a Canadian professional ice hockey player who played in various professional and amateur leagues, including the National Hockey Association.  Amongst the teams he played with were the Montreal Wanderers, Cobalt Silver Kings, Toronto Tecumsehs, and Renfrew Creamery Kings.

After his playing career Vair acted as a referee in the National Hockey League.

References

Notes

External links
Steve Vair at JustSportsStats
Vair bio

1886 births
1959 deaths
Canadian ice hockey centres
Montreal Wanderers players
Cobalt Silver Kings players
Ice hockey people from Ontario
Renfrew Hockey Club players
Sportspeople from Barrie
Toronto Ontarios players
Toronto Tecumsehs players